The International Bureau for Epilepsy is a non-for-profit started in 1961. Its members are from both the lay public and a professional background. It is global in scope. The organization often collaborates with the International League Against Epilepsy (ILAE) to increase understanding about epilepsy.

The organization along with the World Health Organization and ILAE runs the "Global Campaign Against Epilepsy". This campaign was started in 1997 to increase countries efforts to deal with issues facing those with epilepsy.

References

External links 

 

Epilepsy organizations